Elizabeth Napier Dewar is an American lawyer and government official serving as the state solicitor of Massachusetts since January 2016. Prior to serving as the state solicitor, she had served as the assistant state solicitor under former state solicitor Peter Sacks, who is now a judge on the Massachusetts Appeals Court.

Education

Dewar graduated from Harvard University earning a Bachelor of Arts degree, a Master of Philosophy degree from Pembroke College, Cambridge and earned her Juris Doctor from Yale University. After law school, Dewar served as a law clerk at all three levels of the federal judiciary, starting with Louis H. Pollak of the United States District Court for the Eastern District of Pennsylvania, then William A. Fletcher of the United States Court of Appeals for the Ninth Circuit and finally Stephen Breyer of the Supreme Court of the United States.

Career

Dewar joined Ropes & Gray LLP working as an appellate and trial-level lawyer. She then became a civil rights advocate at the Public Interest Law Center in Philadelphia.  

Dewar served as the acting attorney general of Massachusetts after Maura Healey was sworn in as the Governor of Massachusetts at noon on January 5, 2023, taking the helm of the Massachusetts Attorney General’s Office from Kate R. Cook, until Andrea Campbell was sworn in on January 18, 2023.

Notable cases 

While working in the Massachusetts Attorney General’s Office, Dewar secured a $3.5 Million settlement from Aspen Dental, who was accused of deceptive advertising claims.

Personal life

Dewar is the mother of two children.

References

21st-century American lawyers
21st-century American women lawyers
Alumni of Pembroke College, Cambridge
Harvard University alumni
Living people
Massachusetts Attorneys General
Place of birth missing (living people)
Solicitors General of Massachusetts
Yale Law School alumni
Year of birth missing (living people)